Paanjajanyam is a 1982 Indian Malayalam-language film, directed by K. G. Rajasekharan. The film stars Prem Nazir, Swapna, Kaviyoor Ponnamma and P. C. George. The film has musical score by Shankar–Ganesh.

Cast
Prem Nazir
Swapna
Kaviyoor Ponnamma
P. C. George
Hari
Jose Prakash
Alummoodan
Balan K. Nair
Nithya
Beena Kumbalangi

Soundtrack
The music was composed by Shankar–Ganesh with lyrics by Mankombu Gopalakrishnan.

References

External links
 

1982 films
1980s Malayalam-language films
Films scored by Shankar–Ganesh
Films directed by K. G. Rajasekharan